Mario Michela (1856, in Turin – ?) was an Italian art-critic and painter, mostly of landscapes in watercolors.

He also trained as a lawyer. In Turin, he was a pupil of Carlo Felice Biscarra and Lorenzo Delleani. He was a resident of Turin. He painted mainly alpine landscapes, among them those exhibited in 1884 at the Exhibition of Turin: Montagna, Colle Moncenisio; Colli e pianure; Tempo bizzarro; and Laguna grigia. Among other works are: Altura; Giornata triste; Sito alpestre; and Sulle Alpi.

References

19th-century Italian painters
Italian male painters
Painters from Turin
1856 births
Italian landscape painters
Year of death missing
19th-century Italian male artists